Everything & Everyone is the second album by the English musical group Patrick & Eugene.

Track listing

Personnel
Patrick Dawes - percussion, drums, drum programming
Eugene Bezodis - vocals, saxophone, clarinet, flute, recorder, keyboards

Additional personnel
Dominic Bentham - double bass
Simon Eames - ukulele, banjo, keyboards, melodica, euphonium, trombone, bass guitar
Clive Jenner - drums
Jonathan "Stan" White - bass guitar

References

External links
Official website

2008 albums